Michel d'Esne de Betencourt (1540–1614) was a prelate in the Habsburg Netherlands.

Life
D'Esne was born in early January 1540, either in Tournai or in Cambrai, the son of Adam d'Esne, lord of Betencourt, and Bonne de Lalaing. He was educated at Houdain college in Mons and at the age of fifteen became a page at the court of Philip II of Spain. He went on to serve as a soldier for six years in Flanders and Spain. D'Esne then studied theology and poetry, and on 5 January 1589 was ordained to the priesthood. Living in Douai, he spent his time translating devotional and edifying works.

In 1597 Philip II nominated him as bishop of Tournai; papal confirmation followed on 29 November 1597. During his reign as bishop, d'Esne founded or oversaw the establishment of numerous educational and charitable foundations. In 1600, he held a reforming diocesan synod in Tournai, the statutes of which were published. He died on 1 October 1614 and was buried in the choir of Tournai Cathedral.

Translations
  (Antwerp, Plantin Press, 1588)
  (Douai, Widow of Jacques Boscard, 1593)
 Giovanni Pietro Maffei,  (Douai, Jan Bogard, 1594)
  (Douai, Jan Bogard, 1595)
 Pedro de Ribadeneira,  (Douai, Balthazar Bellerus, 1596)
 John Brugman,  (Douai, Balthazar Bellerus, 1608)

References

1540 births
1614 deaths
Bishops of Tournai
People of the Eighty Years' War
Latin–French translators
Italian–French translators